Serine/threonine-protein kinase VRK1 is an enzyme that in humans is encoded by the VRK1 gene.

This gene encodes a member of the vaccinia-related kinase (VRK) family of serine/threonine protein kinases. This gene is widely expressed in human tissues and has increased expression in actively dividing cells, such as those in testis, thymus, fetal liver, and carcinomas. Its protein localizes to the nucleus and has been shown to promote the stability and nuclear accumulation of a transcriptionally active p53 molecule and, in vitro, to phosphorylate Thr18 of p53 and reduce p53 ubiquitination. This gene, therefore, may regulate cell proliferation. This protein also phosphorylates histone, casein, and the transcription factors ATF2 (activating transcription factor 2) and C-jun.

References

Further reading